Brotherhood is the eleventh studio album by American rock band The Doobie Brothers. The album was released on April 15, 1991, by Capitol Records. It was their second and final album for Capitol. It also marked the final appearances on a Doobie Brothers album by bassist Tiran Porter and original drummer John Hartman.

Four of the ten tracks were written entirely by outside musicians, though two of these, songwriter Jerry Lynn Williams and Jim Peterik of Survivor, also collaborated with Tom Johnston and Patrick Simmons on some of their compositions.

The album contained no major hit singles, but "Dangerous", Simmons' anthem to his passion for Harley-Davidson motorcycles, peaked at #2 on the Hot Mainstream Rock Tracks chart and is still performed live by the band. Johnston's "Rollin' On" charted at #12 on the same listing.

Aftermath
The album was a critical and commercial failure, stalling at #82. Shortly after the album's release, the band was dropped by Capitol. There was also a shift in personnel as Tiran Porter left to pursue a brief solo career, frustrated that his own compositions were deemed unsuitable for the band, while John Hartman quit music altogether. Two other former members, drummer Keith Knudsen and guitarist John McFee, were recruited, but for the next nine years, the band concentrated entirely on live work, frustrated by the lack of support they had received from Capitol. The Doobie Brothers would not release another studio album until Sibling Rivalry in 2000, a period of time that was three years longer than the gap between the Doobies' "Farewell Tour" album and Cycles, their reunion album with Tom Johnston.

Track listing

Personnel
The Doobie Brothers
Tom Johnston – guitars, vocals
Patrick Simmons – guitars, vocals
Tiran Porter – bass, vocals
John Hartman – drums
Michael Hossack – drums, percussion

Additional players
Steve Canali – slide guitar
Jimi Fox – percussion
Dale Ockerman – keyboards
Richard Bryant – background vocals
Vicki Randle – background vocals
Rem Smiers – background vocals

Production
Producer and Engineer – Rodney Mills
Assistant Producer – Kathy Nelson
Co-Engineer – Devon Rietveld
Mixing – Rodney Mills and Chris Lord-Alge
Recorded and Mixed at The Record Plant (Sausalito, California); Track 4 recorded and mixed at Image Recording Studios (Hollywood).
Mastered by Bob Ludwig at Masterdisk (New York).
Design – John Kehe
Photography – Peter Darley Miller
Front Cover Photo – Robert Doisneau
Art Direction – Tommy Steele
Management – Bruce Cohn
Tour Manager – Tim McCormick

Charts

References

1991 albums
The Doobie Brothers albums
Albums produced by Rodney Mills
Capitol Records albums